Britt-Inger Johansson (born 24 September 1950), known professionally as Kristina Wayborn, is a Swedish actress who worked mostly in the United Kingdom and in the United States.

Biography 
Wayborn was born Britt-Inger Johansson in Nybro, Småland, Sweden. She was Miss Sweden in 1970, and was a semi-finalist in the Miss Universe pageant that same year. She was also selected as Miss Scandinavia 1971.

Wayborn portrayed screen legend Greta Garbo in the television movie The Silent Lovers (1980), an episode of the miniseries Moviola, which brought her to the attention of the producers of the James Bond films.

She was then cast in probably her best known role as Magda in Octopussy (1983) which features a memorable scene in which Magda  beats up several of villain Kamal Khan's guards, showing a surprising agility and acumen for martial arts. During filming of this scene,  an accident occurred and Wayborn suffered several broken toes. Wayborn's performance in the film came in an era predating the big female action heroines of the box office.  

She subsequently appeared in episodes of such American television series such as The Love Boat, Airwolf, MacGyver, Dallas, General Hospital, Designing Women, Baywatch and That '70s Show, which reunited her with her Octopussy co-star Maud Adams, and other Bond girls Barbara Carrera and Tanya Roberts.

Filmography
 Victory at Entebbe (1976) (TV) as Claudine
 The Silent Lovers (1980) (TV) as Greta Garbo
 Octopussy (1983) as Magda
 Hostage Flight (1985) (TV) as Ilsa Beck
 The Love Boat (2 episodes, 1982 and 1986) as Anna Petrovska / Monique Ellis
 Airwolf (1 episode 1986 "The Girl Who Fell From the Sky") as Dawn Harrison
 MacGyver (1 episode, 1986) as Sara Ashford
 General Hospital (1963) TV series (56 episodes, 1987) as Dr. Greta Ingstrom
 Designing Women (1 episode, 1991) as Gail
 Dangerous Curves (1 episode, 1992) as Norma Desmond 
 Little Ghost (1997) as Christine
 Baywatch (2 episodes, 1993 and 1999) as Lena / Lila Franks
 That '70s Show (1 episode, 2000) as Honor
 Forbidden Warrior (2004) as Sorceress
 The Prometheus Project (2010) as Elizabeth's Mother

References

External links
 
 Kristina Wayborn – From Sweden with Love

1950 births
20th-century Swedish actresses
21st-century Swedish actresses
Expatriate actresses in the United Kingdom
Expatriate actresses in the United States
Living people
Miss Sweden winners
Miss Universe 1970 contestants
People from Kalmar
Swedish television actresses
Swedish film actresses